Idaikaadar (Tamil: இடைக்காடர்) was a Tamil siddhar of the Sangam period. He authored verse 54 of the Tiruvalluva Maalai.

Biography
Unlike Idaikaadanar of the Sangam period, who was a poet by profession, Idaikaadar was a siddhar. Idaikaadar hailed from Idaikattur near Madurai. He belongs to the Idaikkali country. He is known for composing poems with excellent exemplifications.  He has written in praise of the Chola King Kulamuttratthu Thunjiya Killi Valavan (Purananuru verse 42). He has also authored the grammar text "Oosimuri".

He is believed to have attained jeeva samadhi at Thiruvannamalai. He hosted navagrahas during a famine. A small navagraha temple remains at the site today at Idaikattur.

Literary contributions
Verse 54 of the Tiruvalluva Maalai, an encomium written on Valluvar and the Kural literature, is attributed to Idaikaadar. The verse suggests, "Valluvar pierced a mustard and injected seven seas into it and compressed it into what we have today as Kural." It can be noted that Avvaiyar I fortified the meaning of this verse by replacing the first word "mustard" with the word "atom." He is one of the two contributors of the Tiruvalluva Maalai who have penned the verse in the Kural venba metre, the other one being Avvaiyar I.

View on Valluvar and the Kural
Idaikkadar opines about Valluvar and the Kural text thus:

See also

 Tiruvalluva Maalai
 Sangam literature
 List of Sangam poets

Notes

References

 

Tiruvalluva Maalai contributors
Year of birth missing
Year of death missing
Tamil Hindu saints